is an interchange passenger railway station located in the city of Kuwana, Mie Prefecture, Japan. It is jointly operated by the Central Japan Railway Company (JR Tōkai), and they private railway operator Kintetsu Railway and its subsidiary Yōrō Railway. Sangi Railway's Nishi-Kuwana Station is next to the station.

Lines
Kuwana Station is served by the JR Kansai Main Line, and is 23.8 rail kilometers from the terminus of that line at Nagoya Station. It is also served by the Kintetsu Nagoya Line and is 23.7 rail kilometers from the terminus of that line at Kintetsu Nagoya Station. It is also a terminal station for the Yōrō Railway Yōrō Line, and is 57.5 kilometers from the opposing terminal of that line at Ibi Station.

Station layout
The station consists of a single island platform and a side platform serving the 3 tracks used by JR Central. There are an additional two island platforms with 4 tracks for use by the Kintetsu and Yōrō Railway.

Platforms

Adjacent stations

History
Kuwana Station opened on July 5, 1894 as a station on the privately-owned Kansai Railway. The line was nationalized on October 1, 1907, becoming part of the Japanese Government Railway (JGR) network. The Yōrō Railway began operations to Kuwana Station on April 27, 1919. The Ise Electric Railway (later known as the Kintetsu Nagoya Line) began operations on January 30, 1929. Scheduled freight operations were discontinued from 1982.

Station numbering was introduced to the section of the Kansai Main Line operated JR Central in March 2018; Kuwana Station was assigned station number CI07.

Passenger statistics
In fiscal 2019, the station was used by an average of 3,521 passengers daily (boarding passengers only). During the same period, the Kintetsu portion of the station was used by 12,360 passengers and the Yōrō Railway portion by 2,228 passengers daily.

Surrounding area
Kuwana City Office
Kuwana-juku
Kuwana Castle ruins 
Japan National Route 1

See also
 List of railway stations in Japan

References

External links

 Kintetsu: Kintetsu Station
 JR Central Kuwana Station
Yōrō Railway Kuwana Station

Railway stations in Japan opened in 1895
Railway stations in Mie Prefecture
Stations of Yōrō Railway
Stations of Kintetsu Railway
Kuwana, Mie